Giovanni J. Ughi (born Padova, Italy), engineer and scientist, is one of the inventors of multimodality Optical Coherence Tomography (OCT) and Laser-induced fluorescence molecular imaging, pioneering a first-in-man study of coronary arteries during his work at Massachusetts General Hospital and Harvard Medical School. The results of his work, combining two imaging technologies, may better identify dangerous coronary plaques, responsible for coronary artery disease and myocardial infarction. He also was one of the pioneers of targeted molecular imaging of human atherosclerosis, determining the use of molecular agents (e.g., indocyanine green (ICG)-enhanced near-infrared fluorescence) to illuminate high-risk features of human atherosclerotic plaques, arterial inflammation and plaque progression, and for the identification of unhealed stents at higher risk of stent thrombosis.

Dr. Ughi also made significant contributions to the development of image processing and AI methods for the  automated analysis of intracoronary optical coherence tomography (OCT) images, contributing to the widespread adoption of intracoronary OCT imaging technology. He is recognized for the development of methods for the automatic quantification of stent and disease characteristics on intracoronary optical coherence tomography images.

He authored over 50 papers in peer-reviewed scientific international journals.

References

External links
 tctMD: Does New Dual-Modality Imaging Come Closer to Uncovering Vulnerable Plaques?
 Laser Focus World: OCT, fluorescence imaging pair to better identify heart attack-prone coronary plaques
 Science Daily: Combining two imaging technologies may better identify dangerous coronary plaques
 Bullock Fellowship Award
 Giovanni J. Ughi on Google Scholar
 PubMed

Living people
Massachusetts General Hospital fellows
Harvard Medical School alumni
Harvard Medical School staff
Catholic University of Leuven alumni
University of Padua alumni
Biography (science and academia) articles by importance
Year of birth missing (living people)